The Kingston Trio: The Stewart Years is a compilation of The Kingston Trio's recordings when John Stewart was a member of the Trio along with Bob Shane and Nick Reynolds.

The Stewart Years is a 10-CD box set and was released in 2000. It contains 286 songs, many of them are previously unissued and live tracks. The set includes a  hardcover book containing photos and stories of the group, recording sessions, and notes on the songs.

Reception

Allmusic critic Greg Adams was equivocal about the extent of the package, writing: "The Stewart Years is a gorgeous ten-disc box set with hardbound book that collects everything the Trio recorded during Stewart's tenure... The Stewart version of the trio was more pop-oriented, political, and experimental (some unsuccessful attempts at folk-rock are preserved for posterity here). While they had their successes... their clean-cut collegiate image could never quite adapt to the counterculture and protest folk movement... The Stewart Years is a beautiful, comprehensive, and expensive artifact suitable for libraries and affluent fans."

Personnel
Bob Shane – vocals, guitar, banjo
Nick Reynolds – vocals, tenor guitar, bongos, conga
John Stewart – vocals, banjo, guitar, harmonica
Dean Reilly – bass
Glen Campbell – banjo, guitar
Andy Belling – organ
George Callender – bass
Randy Cierley – guitar, percussion
Irving Cottler – drums
John Chambers – drums
Jerry Granelli – drums
Modesto Duran – percussion
Harold Hensley – fiddle
Jack Marshall – guitar
Allan Reuss – guitar
Manuel Stevens – trumpet
Anthony Terran – trumpet
John Rotella – reeds
Art Smith – reeds
Ben Kanter – reeds
William Hinshaw – French horn
Darrel Terwilliger – violin
Tibor Zelig – violin
Leonard Malarsky – violin
Sidney Sharp – violin
Myron Sandler – viola
Harry Hyams – viola
Alexander Neiman – viola
Joseph DiFiore – viola
Emmet Sargeant – cello
Jimmie Haskell  – arranger, leader

Production notes
Voyle Gilmore – producer
Frank Werber – producer
Paul Surratt – reissue producer, photography, illustrations
Adam Skeaping – mastering
Jay Ranellucci – mixing
Richard Weize – tape research, discography
R. A. Andreas – photography, illustrations
Henry Diltz – photography, illustrations
George Karras – photography, illustrations
Wolfgang Taubenauer – artwork
Holger Von Bargen – art direction
Ben Blake – discography, song notes
Bill Bush – biographical information
Russ Wapensky – discography

References

The Kingston Trio albums
albums arranged by Jimmie Haskell
Albums produced by Voyle Gilmore
2000 compilation albums
Bear Family Records compilation albums